Francis James "Frank" McCashney (9 August 1890 – 19 July 1951) was an Australian rules footballer who played with  in the Victorian Football League (VFL).

McCashney was the sixth of ten children born to Henry William McCashney and Mary Anne Robson. McCashney's family owned a sawmill at Trentham and he commenced his football career playing with the Trentham club. He was a great stab kick who could send long driving left foot kicks downfield and in 1913 he represented Victoria against South Australia. Two of his brothers, John McCashney (South Melbourne) and Jim McCashney, also played VFL football.

He married Daisy Ella Smith in 1916 and they had three children. They lived in Richmond and he worked as a mechanic after his football career. Frank McCashney died of cancer in 1951.

Notes

External links 

1890 births
1951 deaths
Australian rules footballers from Victoria (Australia)
Richmond Football Club players